Not to be confused with Ain't That Lovin' You, Baby (Jimmy Reed song)

"Ain't That Loving You, Baby" is a song written by Clyde Otis and Ivory Joe Hunter and originally recorded by Eddie Riff in 1956. Elvis Presley recorded the song in 1958 and released the song as a single in 1964.

Background
It was recorded by Elvis Presley on June 10, 1958, but wasn't released as a single by him until September 1964 (with no comma in the title) when it reached number 16 on the Billboard chart, with "Ask Me" as the flipside. It is a standard shuffle in E major. The song, along with "Ask Me", was later included on the 1968 compilation album Elvis' Gold Records Volume 4, and an alternate take with a faster tempo was released in 1985 on the compilation album Reconsider Baby.

Personnel
 Elvis Presley - lead vocals
 Hank Garland - lead guitar
 Bob Moore - double bass
 Floyd Cramer - piano
 D. J. Fontana, Buddy Harman - drums

References

External links

Elvis Presley songs
1956 singles
1964 singles
RPM Top Singles number-one singles
Songs written by Clyde Otis
Songs written by Ivory Joe Hunter
1956 songs